Battulgyn Achitbileg (born 30 July 1986) is a Mongolian athlete who competes in the sprinting events. He represented his country at the 2012 World Indoor Championships in Istanbul.

He currently holds national records in the 100 and 200 metres.

Competition record

Personal bests
Outdoor
100 metres – 10.65 (+0.8 m/s, Wuhan 2015)
200 metres – 21.53 (+0.8 m/s, Incheon 2014)
Indoor
60 metres – 6.95 (Doha 2016)

References

1986 births
Living people
Mongolian male sprinters
Athletes (track and field) at the 2014 Asian Games
Asian Games competitors for Mongolia
Competitors at the 2013 Summer Universiade
21st-century Mongolian people